A tree grate is a metallic grating installed at the same level with the pavement around a tree that allows the soil underneath to stay uncompacted and the pedestrians to walk near the tree without stepping on the soil.
Grate slots allow tree roots to absorb air, sunlight, and water, meanwhile its soil is protected from pedestrian traffic impact. Tree grates create a protective barrier, providing uncompacted soil and development space for tree roots. They also serve as a decorative element along ceremonial streets, matching a street's design style and personality.

References 

 Trees in the Urban Landscape: Site Assessment, Design, and Installation, Peter J. Trowbridge, Nina L. Bassuk, John Wiley & Sons, 2004, page 91
 Site Furnishings: A Complete Guide to the Planning, Selection and Use of Landscape Furniture and Amenities, Bill Main, Gail Greet Hannah, John Wiley & Sons, 2010, page 159

External links 
 http://www.dictionaryofconstruction.com/definition/tree-grate.html
Tree grates in "The ultimate manhole covers web site"

Pavements
Pedestrian infrastructure